Gladeville is an unincorporated community in Wilson County, Tennessee. The community is named for the surrounding cedar glades— a unique type of ecosystem that thrives in the thin or barren soil of south Wilson County.

Gladeville was founded in 1852 on land of Benjamin Hooker Jr. and grew steadily for several years, although the outbreak of the Civil War slowed its growth.  The post office was established in 1855 with John M. Bland as the first postmaster. Notable Gladeville natives include Grand Ole Opry fiddler Sid Harkreader (1898–1988).  The community is home to the Nashville Superspeedway.

Gladeville was formerly a regional softball hub in the 1980s and 1990s with many large tournaments being held in the spring and summer months.  However, in the early 2000s a significant decrease in activity occurred and by the mid 2000s, activity ceased completely. The softball field has been used for various youth teams since, and is currently utilized by the Diamond Dawgs, which boasts 11U and 12U AAA traveling competitive baseball teams.

Gladeville has a small downtown area at the intersection of Gladeville Road & Stewarts Ferry Pike that features several restaurants and businesses.

The community was struck by an EF-1 tornado on the afternoon of November 18, 2017.

Demographics

Education
Gladeville is served by Wilson County Schools. It is zoned to Gladeville Elementary School, Gladeville Middle School, and Wilson Central High School.

See also
Cedars of Lebanon State Park

References

External links
Wilson County, Tennessee

Unincorporated communities in Wilson County, Tennessee
Unincorporated communities in Tennessee
Populated places established in 1852
1852 establishments in Tennessee